Snir Shoker (born 8 May 1989) is an Israeli footballer who plays as a midfielder for Hapoel Ra'anana.

Career

Shoker started his career with Israeli top flight side Hapoel Ra'anana, where he has made 313 appearances and scored 15 goals. He had suffered relegation to the Israeli second tier and helped them earn promotion to the Israeli top flight. On 22 August 2009, he debuted for Hapoel Ra'anana at the Israeli Premier League during a 1-2 loss to Hapoel Be'er Sheva. On 12 February 2011, Shoker scored his first goal for Hapoel Ra'anana during a 1-1 draw with Hapoel Ramat Gan Givatayim.

References

External links
 

1989 births
Living people
Israeli footballers
Hapoel Ra'anana A.F.C. players
Liga Leumit players
Israeli Premier League players
Association football midfielders
Footballers from Ra'anana